RAG FAIR (ラグフェアー Ragu Feā) are a Japanese male a cappella band. Its members are Reo Tsuchiya, Yosuke Hikichi, Kenichi Arai, Yoshiyuki Kato, Takamasa Kano, and Masayoshi Okumura.

They met each other at Saitama University. An a cappella circle named "chocoletz"(チョコレッツ) was formed in Saitama University in 1997, and RAG FAIR emerged from this in 1999. They developed streetlives in those days around Oomiya Station and Musashiurawa Station.

In 2001 "Chikara no kagiri go-gogo-!!" a variety program affiliated with Fuji TV, the a cappella members of group "replica" (レプリカ) (where Masayoshi Okumura participated in those days) appears on the television show "Hamonepu"(ハモネプ). Also in 2001, RAG FAIR debut with album "I RAG YOU".

In 2002, two singles were released simultaneously, "koi no mileage"(恋のマイレージ) and "She side story"(Sheサイドストーリー). Both singles were splendid achievements, snagging the first and second places, respectively, in the singles' first appearances in the Oricon Weekly Ranking charts. RAG FAIR participated for the first time in the 53rd annual NHK Kouhaku Uta Gassen in 2002, performing "koi no mileage."

In October 2003, their comedy program "Omatase! RAG Teishoku"(おまたせ！ラグ定食) began airing on Fuji TV, running up until March 2004. At the end of the program, the members announced a second "renewal" comedy program, entitled RAG&PEACE. This program ran for another six months in 2004.

A commercial for McDonald's "Fish Mac Dipper" aired in March 2004. It received the "McDonald's Excellent Advertising Award" for 2004.

They performed their first live at the Nippon Budokan publicly on December 10, 2005, and they released the DVD "streetlive! in Budoukan".

In January 2011, RAG FAIR announced that they would take an indefinite dormancy period starting March 2011, concluding their performance career with a live tour named "THAT'S RAG FAIR".

Discography

Singles

Albums
 I RAG YOU (December 19, 2001)
 AIR (January 22, 2003)
 PON (July 2, 2003)
 CIRCLE (September 8, 2004)
 RAGood STORY (RAGッ STORY) (November 9, 2005)
 Okurimono (オクリモノ) (October 4, 2006)
 Colours(カラーズ) (January 15, 2008)

External links 
 Official Web Site of RAG FAIR (Japanese)
 Official Web Site by Toy’s Factory (Japanese)
 Yosuke Hikichi's Blog (Japanese)
 Yoshiyuki Kato's Blog (Japanese)
 Reo Tsuchiya's Blog (Japanese)
 Masayoshi Okumura's Blog (Japanese)
 Livejournal RAG FAIR Community (English)

Japanese pop music groups
Toy's Factory artists
Musical groups from Saitama Prefecture
Watanabe Entertainment